FC Narta is a women's football club from Drăsliceni, Moldova.

Titles
 4 Championship : 2005–06, 2006–07, 2007–08, 2008–09
 4 Moldovan Women's Cup : 2006, 2007, 2008, 2009

UEFA Women’s Champions League

References

External links
Team info at Monenegro FA

Women's football clubs in Moldova
Football clubs in Moldova